Freddie the Freeloader's Christmas Dinner (aka Red Skelton's Christmas Dinner) is a TV special that premiered on Home Box Office (HBO) on December 13, 1981. The program stars Red Skelton and was part of HBO's Standing Room Only series of specials. This was one of Skelton's final television performances.

Plot
Freddie the Freeloader prepares to scrape together money and enjoy a Christmas dinner with his equally poverty-stricken friend Professor Humperdo at one of New York's fancy restaurants. When a lost dog appears in his apartment, he is accused of thievery by his wealthy owner. After a meeting with the bag lady Molly, he visits a hospital and entertains some children for Christmas. Freddie busts the professor out of the drunk tank and the two eventually reach the restaurant - and treat themselves to a feast.

The special includes drama, miming, and music, for which Skelton was noted. Songs sung by Skelton in this special include "Christmas Comes But Once a Year" and "I Believe".

Main cast
 Red Skelton as Freddie the Freeloader
 Vincent Price as Professor Humperdo
 Imogene Coca as Molly, a bag lady
 Jack Duffy as Santa
 Tudi Wiggins as Mrs. Witherspoon

See also
 Standing Room Only
 On Location

References

External links 

Freddie the Freeloader's Christmas Dinner at Rotten Tomatoes
 Red Skelton's Christmas Dinner at Red Skelton.info

HBO network specials
1981 television specials
English-language television shows
1981 in American television
American Christmas television specials